The Easterlin paradox is a finding in happiness economics formulated in 1974 by Richard Easterlin, then professor of economics at the University of Pennsylvania, and the first economist to study happiness data. The paradox states that at a point in time happiness varies directly with income both among and within nations, but over time happiness does not trend upward as income continues to grow. It is the contradiction between the point-of-time and time series findings that is the root of the paradox. Various theories have been advanced to explain the Paradox, but the Paradox itself is solely an empirical generalization. The existence of the paradox has been strongly disputed by other researchers.

Evidence 
The original evidence for the paradox was United States data. Subsequently, supporting findings were given for other developed nations, and, more recently, for less developed countries and countries transitioning from socialism to capitalism. The original conclusion for the United States was based on data from 1946 to 1970; later evidence through 2014 confirmed the initial finding — the trend in United States happiness has been flat or even slightly negative over a roughly seven decades stretch in which real incomes more than tripled. 

The time series conclusion of the paradox refers to long-term trends. As the economy expands and contracts, fluctuations in happiness occur together with those in income, but the fluctuations in income occur around a rising trend line, whereas those in happiness take place around a horizontal trend.

Possible explanations 
A couple of explanations for the paradox have been offered. 

The first explanation draws on the effect of social comparison. The effect of additional money on how we feel about our lives is not just about how wealthy we are in absolute terms, but how wealthy we are compared to other people.

The second explanation appeals to hedonic adaptation and the fact that people get used to having more income. As we’ve gone from having iPhone 5s, to iPhone 6s, to iPhone 7s, to iPhone 8s and so on, these have not made a lasting improvement to our wellbeing because we quickly get used to them.

Criticism
Objections to the paradox focus on the time series generalization, that trends in happiness and income are not related. In a 2008 article economists Betsey Stevenson and Justin Wolfers state that “the core of the Easterlin paradox lies in Easterlin’s failure to isolate statistically significant relationships between average levels of happiness and economic growth through time,” and present time series evidence of a significant positive statistical association between happiness and income. A 2012 article by the same authors and Daniel Sacks returns to this time series criticism with new data, though at times the article asserts that the paradox is a contradiction between two types of cross-section evidence — data for persons and for countries. Outside of economics, two founding fathers in the study of self-reported happiness, Ed Diener in psychology, and Ruut Veenhoven in sociology, have each, with their collaborators, also presented evidence of a significantly positive time series relationship. A rebuttal by Easterlin points out that these studies do not focus on identifying long term trends; rather, they are based on time series that are short or have only two observations — in both cases, insufficient observations to establish a trend. The positive association they present is that between the fluctuations in happiness and income, not the trends. 

It is sometimes said that the flattening of the happiness trend occurs after some minimum level of income. While cross-sectional data supports a curvilinear relationship between income and happiness in Chinese  and Asian samples, time series for China and Japan, both of which start from low income levels, give no indication of a threshold.

See also
Subjective well-being
Economic growth
Hedonic treadmill
Progress
Wikiprogress

References

Further reading
Clark, A., P. Frijters, and M. Shields (2008). “Relative Income, Happiness, and Utility: An Explanation for the Easterlin Paradox and Other Puzzles,” Journal of Economic Literature: 46(1), 95-144.

Beja, E. (2014). “Income Growth and Happiness: Reassessment of the Easterlin Paradox,” International Review of Economics: 61 (4), 329-346.

DeNeve, J., D. Ward, G. Keulenaer, B. van Landeghem, G. Kavetsos, and M. Norton (2018). “The Asymmetric Experience of Positive and Negative Economic Growth: Global Evidence Using Subjective Well-Being Data,” Review of Economic Statistics: 100 (2), 362-375.

External links
Richard Easterlin's website at the University of Southern California 

Paradoxes in economics
Happiness
Gross domestic product